John Neilson (14 June 1858 – 16 July 1915) was a Scottish international rugby union player. He played as a forward.

He played for West of Scotland before moving on to Glasgow Academicals.

He was called up for the Glasgow District side for the 1874 provincial match against Edinburgh District on 5 December 1874 while still with West of Scotland. He also played in Glasgow's first winning side against Edinburgh in 1881.

He was called up to the Scotland squad in March 1878 and played England at The Oval on 4 March 1878. He was also called up the following year for the England match at Raeburn Place, Edinburgh on 10 March 1879. At the time of his international caps he was playing for Glasgow Academicals.

His brother Tom Paterson Neilson also played rugby union for Glasgow District and Scotland.

References

1858 births
1915 deaths
Scottish rugby union players
Scotland international rugby union players
History of rugby union in Scotland
West of Scotland FC players
Glasgow District (rugby union) players
Glasgow Academicals rugby union players
Rugby union players from Glasgow
Rugby union forwards